Thomas Sanderson Callender (20 September 1920 – 25 February 2002) was an English professional football centre half of the 1930s, 1940s and 1950s.

Callender began his career before the Second World War with local non-league side Crawcrook Albion before moving to Third Division North side Lincoln City. After the war, Callender moved to Gateshead where he made his name. Although playing in the lower divisions of the Football League Callender was considered worthy of a place in the England team by contemporaries. Indeed, such was the esteem in which his play was held that Gateshead turned down a £15,000 offer from Newcastle United for his services. Wolverhampton Wanderers manager Major Frank Buckley also allegedly made an undisclosed offer for the outstanding centre back. At Gateshead Callender and his brother Jack made 910 league appearances, a record for two brothers at the same club, plus 75 cup appearances between them. Callender scored 58 goals for Gateshead in 439 league appearances, scoring an additional 3 goals in 35 appearances in the FA Cup. Callender also captained the Third Division North XI v Third Division South XI.

On his retirement Callender managed Gateshead for a short period. He died on 25 February 2002 at Lobley Hill, Tyne and Wear.

References

1920 births
2002 deaths
People from Wylam
Footballers from Northumberland
English footballers
Crawcrook Albion F.C. players
Lincoln City F.C. players
Gateshead F.C. players
English Football League players
Gateshead A.F.C. players
Association football central defenders